The Iloilo River Esplanade is a  esplanade and linear park along the Iloilo River in Iloilo City, Iloilo. It stretches on both sides of the river, from Carpenter's Bridge in Mandurriao and Molo districts to Muelle Loney (Drilon) Bridge in the City Proper and Lapuz districts. It is the longest linear park in the Philippines and was designed by landscape architect and PGAA Creative Design founder Paulo Alcazaren. The project is part of the Iloilo River Rehabilitation Project.

The esplanade has become one of the most popular tourist attractions in Iloilo since its opening on August 18, 2012, attracting thousands to millions of visitors each year from all over the country and the world. In 2018, the linear park was cited as a "Haligi ng Dangal" awardee for the Landscape Architecture category by the National Commission for Culture and the Arts (NCCA) through the National Committee on Architecture and the Allied Arts.

History

Dike road 
The road, formally known as Treñas Boulevard, was built to help ease traffic congestion on congested General Luna Street. The site was an existing dike road devoid of shade and also originally built chiefly as a flood control measure. Locals, on the other hand, used the road for recreation, such as jogging and biking. The Iloilo City Government realized and reconsidered it, and decided to build a linear park instead of a road.

Designing and river rehabilitation 
The city government gave in to public clamor and started work on developing the riverside stretch into a public park. Former Senate President Franklin Drilon supported the project with funds from his Priority Development Assistance Fund, along with former Iloilo City Mayor Jed Patrick Mabilog and incumbent Iloilo City Mayor Jerry P. Treñas (at the time, an Iloilo City congressman), and launched the esplanade project as a key component of their Iloilo River Improvement initiative.

The Iloilo River Development Council was at the forefront of the campaign for rehabilitating the river, which also involved various sectors, including private business groups and educational institutions. Businesses made river cleanups part of their corporate social responsibility projects, while schools made them part of the national service training programs.

The administration of former Mayor Jed Mabilog was also able to relocate about 1,000 informal settlers along the river into proper housing sites.

Renowned Filipino architect and PGAA Creative Design founder Paulo Alcazaren, who also worked on the Singapore Quay and River Esplanade, was tapped to draw up layouts and designs for the public linear park.

Opening and extensions 
The transformation of the boulevard was the initial part of a larger project to provide both sides of the Iloilo River with esplanades catering primarily to pedestrians. On August 18, 2012, the first phase of the project was opened to the public and cost ₱58.7 million. The project was eventually expanded into the  Esplanade 2 on the other side of the river in Molo district, creating a walk-friendly loop between the two bridges.

In 2017, more phases of the project were funded and constructed by the Department of Public Works and Highways (DPWH), and they were completed in 2020, with a total length of 9.035 km (5.614 mi) and a total cost of ₱1.12 billion. The Iloilo River Esplanade became the longest linear park in the country with a total of ten phases and that traverses through five of the seven Iloilo City districts: Molo, Mandurriao, La Paz, Lapuz, and the City Proper. However, the city government announced in 2018 that it would no longer allow the extension of the Iloilo River Esplanade project towards the mouth of the river, citing the discovery that many corporations use the area and would be impacted if the project continued up to the Parola area in the City Proper.

In April 2022, the DPWH began the construction of the ₱1.4-billion road project, which will be an alternate route from Iloilo City and towns in southern Iloilo province, connecting Barangay Tabucan in Mandurriao, Iloilo City to Barangay Cagbang in Oton. The road project will be known as the Iloilo Sunset Boulevard and will also include an extension of the  Iloilo River Esplanade.

Awards and recognition 
The Iloilo River Esplanade has a total of three major awards. This includes the 2017 GantimPALA Excellence Award for Institutional Projects by the Philippine Association of Landscape Architects, 2018 Haligi ng Dangal Award for the Landscape Architecture category in the 2018 National Commission for Culture and the Arts (NCCA) Haligi ng Dangal Awards, and 2018 Galing Pook Award for Iloilo River Development by Galing Pook Foundation.

Iloilo City Government's Iloilo Esplanade has been benchmarked by the other local governments in the country and has inspired other similar public infrastructure projects, including the Iloilo Bike Lane, Bacolod Esplanade, Iligan Esplanade, Malandog Hamtic Antique Esplanade, and San Jose Antique Esplanade, among others.

Gallery

See also 
 Iloilo River

References

Parks in the Philippines
Buildings and structures in Iloilo City
Redeveloped ports and waterfronts in the Philippines
Tourist attractions in Iloilo City
Linear parks
Urban public parks